|}

Politics of New York have evolved over time. The Democratic Party dominates politics in the state, with the Democrats representing a plurality of voters in New York State, constituting over twice as many registered voters as any other political party affiliation or lack thereof. Historically, New York was a swing state, as from its inaugural election in 1792 until the 1984 election, the state voted for the winning candidate all but seven times (1812, 1856, 1868, 1876, 1916, 1948, and 1968). It voted for the winning candidate 86% of the time, however, since 1988, the state has voted Democratic by large margins and frequently provides them over 60% of the vote. Democrats have also controlled the Assembly since 1971 and the Senate since 2019. New York currently has two Democratic United States senators. New York's Class I Senate seat has been Democratic since 1959 and New York's Class III Senate seat has been Democratic since 1999. In addition, New York's House congressional delegation has had a Democratic majority since 1965.

Current issues
For a long time, same-sex marriages were not allowed in New York, but those marriages from other jurisdictions were recognized. In May 2008, Governor David Paterson issued an affirmation that the state would recognize same-sex marriages performed elsewhere. In December 2009, the senate declined to pass a same-sex marriage bill, though polling earlier that year had indicated that a majority of New Yorkers supported same-sex marriages. Since 2004, the public pension systems of both the state and New York City allocate benefits in recognition of same-sex marriages performed outside New York. Former Governor Eliot Spitzer stated he would introduce legislation to legalize same-sex marriage. On April 27, 2007, then-Governor Spitzer unveiled such a bill. Same-sex marriage was legalized in June 2011.

From 1984 through 2004, no budget was passed on time. The state has a strong imbalance of payments with the federal government. New York State receives 82 cents in services for every $1 it sends to Washington in taxes. The state ranks near the bottom, in 42nd place, in federal spending per tax dollar. For decades, it has been the established practice for the state to pass legislation for some meritorious project, but then mandate county and municipal government to actually pay for it. New York State has its counties pay a higher percentage of welfare costs than any other state, and New York State is the only state which requires counties to pay a portion of Medicaid.

Voter registration

New York's Federal Representation

Following each decennial census, the New York Redistricting Commission forms to realign the state's congressional districts. New York currently has 26 House districts. In the 118th Congress, 15 of New York's seats are held by Democrats and 11 are held by Republicans. There are as follows:

New York's 1st congressional district represented by Nick LaLota (R)
New York's 2nd congressional district represented by Andrew Garbarino (R)
New York's 3rd congressional district represented by George Santos (R)
New York's 4th congressional district represented by Anthony D'Esposito (R)
New York's 5th congressional district represented by Gregory Meeks (D)
New York's 6th congressional district represented by Grace Meng (D)
New York's 7th congressional district represented by Nydia Velazquez (D)
New York's 8th congressional district represented by Hakeem Jeffries (D)
New York's 9th congressional district represented by Yvette Clarke (D)
New York's 10th congressional district represented by Dan Goldman (D)
New York's 11th congressional district represented by Nicole Malliotakis (R)
New York's 12th congressional district represented by Jerry Nadler (D)
New York's 13th congressional district represented by Adriano Espaillat (D)
New York's 14th congressional district represented by Alexandria Ocasio-Cortez (D)
New York's 15th congressional district represented by Ritchie Torres (D)
New York's 16th congressional district represented by Jamaal Bowman (D)
New York's 17th congressional district represented by Mike Lawler (R)
New York's 18th congressional district represented by Pat Ryan (D)
New York's 19th congressional district represented by Marc Molinaro (R)
New York's 20th congressional district represented by Paul Tonko (D)
New York's 21st congressional district represented by Elise Stefanik (R)
New York's 22nd congressional district represented by Brandon Williams (R)
New York's 23rd congressional district represented by Nick Langworthy (R)
New York's 24th congressional district represented by Claudia Tenney (R)
New York's 25th congressional district represented by Joseph Morelle (D)
New York's 26th congressional district represented by Brian Higgins (D)

New York's two United States Senators are Democrats Chuck Schumer and Kirsten Gillibrand, serving since 1999 and 2009, respectively. 

New York is part of the United States District Court for the Northern District of New York, United States District Court for the Eastern District of New York, United States District Court for the Southern District of New York and United States District Court for the Western District of New York in the federal judiciary. The district's cases are appealed to the New York City-based United States Court of Appeals for the Second Circuit.

See also
 Government of New York (state)
 Elections in New York
 Electoral reform in New York
 2009 New York State Senate leadership crisis
 C40 Cities Climate Leadership Group

Topics

 Alcohol laws of New York
 New York divorce law
 Gun laws in New York
 New York energy law
 LGBT rights in New York
 Capital punishment in New York
 Rent control in New York

References

Notes

Further reading

Paterson, David "Black, Blind, & In Charge: A Story of Visionary Leadership and Overcoming Adversity." Skyhorse Publishing. New York, New York, 2020.